St1 Oy is a Finnish energy company owning the St1 service stations' chain in Finland, Sweden, Norway and Poland.  The company was established in 1995 under the name Greenergy Baltic Oy.  In 1997, the St1 chain was established in Finland .  In 2000 Greenergy Baltic changed its name to Green.  In the same year, it purchased the St1 chain.  The company adopted the name St1 in 2005.

St1 Oy owns around 1400 service stations in four countries.  The first service station outside of Finland was established in 2004 in Sweden.  In 2007, the company took over Oy Esso Ab, a subsidiary of ExxonMobil in Finland, and its service stations.  In 2009, St1 Oy purchased 198 unmanned filling stations in Sweden and Norway from Statoil.  In 2010, it purchased service stations from Royal Dutch Shell in Finland and Sweden.

In addition the service stations, the St1 Oy owns the St1 Refinery in Gothenburg, produces ethanol fuel at six bioethanol plants in Finland, and generates and sells electricity.  Together with the SOK Group it owns the wind farms developer TuuliWatti Oy.

See also

 Energy in Finland

References

External links

Official website
St1 Biofuels on Cleantech Finland Website

Oil companies of Finland
Alcohol fuel producers
Automotive fuel retailers
Companies based in Helsinki